Wheeler Crest is a small residential unincorporated community in southwestern Mono County, California.  It functions as a bedroom community for workers in Bishop and Mammoth Lakes, and as a home for retirees. Geographically, it sits on the Sherwin Grade, which divides Round Valley in Inyo County from Long Valley in Mono County.

Demographics
The 2000 United States Census reported the population of Wheeler Crest to be 196. For 2003, the California Department of Finance estimated the population to be 200.  In 2000, 6% of the population was under 5 years old, 70% were from 18 to 64, and 11% were over 65. The median age was 51. Ninety-five percent of the households were owner occupied and 5% were rented. Under the current Mono County General Plan, the 116 developed parcels could be augmented by another 391 housing units.

Fire Protection District
Wheeler Crest is the seat of the Wheeler Crest Fire Protection District, which was established in 1982.

References

Unincorporated communities in California
Unincorporated communities in Mono County, California